Talaat Zakaria (‎; 18 December 1960 – 8 October 2019) was an Egyptian comedic actor. In 1984, Zakaria graduated from The Higher Institute of Dramatic Art of Egypt and began his acting career by taking bit roles in many movies, plays, and television shows.

Biography
In 2005, Zakaria earned his big break when he played his first leading role in the film Haha w Tofaha with the famous Egyptian actress Yasmin Abdulaziz.  This film marked his rise from bit actor to comedic leading-man status in Egyptian cinema.

Zakaria died on 8 October 2019 from an inflammation of the brain at age 58.

Filmography

Television
{| class="wikitable"
|-
!Year       !!         Show            !!      Role
|-
|  2007 || Mabrok Galak Ala''' || Police Officer
|-
|2007-2015
|Super Henedy
|Talaat (voice)
|-
|  2010 || Mn Ghir Ma'ad ||
|-
|  2013 || El Arraf ||
|-
|}

TheatreDu Re Me FasoliaEl-BoubouWar'a kol Magnon Emra'aKahyon Rabah MellionSokar hanemWe Ba'deen?''

References

External links

elcinema.com
EgyFilm Official Channel on Youtube

1960 births
2019 deaths
Egyptian male film actors
People from Alexandria
Egyptian comedians
Egyptian male television actors
Egyptian male stage actors
Neurological disease deaths in Egypt
Infectious disease deaths in Egypt
Deaths from meningitis